Puławska Street is one of the main streets of the city of Warsaw, Poland. It links the southern City Centre and the southern boroughs of Mokotów and Ursynów with the suburb of Piaseczno.

The street is named after the city of Puławy, Poland.

External links
  History of Puławska

Streets in Warsaw
Mokotów